Nancy Oshana Wehbe (born June 25, 1975) is an Assyrian-American professional Bodybuilder, who has competed in bodybuilding and bikini modeling from 2000-2012.

Biography
Wehbe was  born in Tell-Tamar, a small village in Syria, she was only ten years of age when her parents sent her and her older brother to live with their relatives in Chicago to receive an American education.

Wehbe, who is of Assyrian ethnicity, asserted her independence at a very young age and began working to support her schooling when she was only 15. She graduated with a Bachelors of Arts degree in International Business/ Business Management. Upon graduation, Nancy started work at a Fortune-500 company where she stayed for 5 years.

in the mid-1990s She had begun an intense weight training regiment. Immediately she noticed great results and received countless compliments. Not long after She decided to compete at the official fitness and bodybuilding events. She trained hard and followed a strict nutritional diet prior to any competition.

Wehbe who turned bodybuilder has since turned every road block into a stepping stone by overcoming the frivolous impediment of cultural barriers and gender prejudices and has gained a widespread respect and support for a hardcore competitive sport that requires fitness and modeling, both, in and out of her Assyrian community.

She became a Certified Personal Trainer by the American Council on Exercise (ACE).

Awards and competitions
2012 NPC Junior Nationals Figure division D placed 10th
2012 NPC Illinois State Masters overall winner
2012 NPC Illinois State Masters 35-39 winner
2012 NPC Figure open placed 5th
2009 NPC Midwest Ironman placed 4th
2009 NPC Natural open class placed 1st
2003 INBJ Great Lakes Bodybuilding placed 2nd
2003 NPC Junior Nationals placed 16th
2002 NPC Junior Nationals placed 7th
2002 NPC Regional Midwest placed 1st
2002 NPC Regional Midwest overall winner
2001 NGA Natural Powerhouse placed 1st
2000 IFF Miss Bikini National overall winner

References

Living people
American female bodybuilders
Fitness and figure competitors
Professional bodybuilders
American people of Assyrian descent
Syrian emigrants to the United States
1975 births
Assyrian/Syriac Syrians
21st-century American women